"House of Cards" is a song by the English rock band Radiohead from their seventh studio album In Rainbows (2007). It was serviced to American modern rock radio on April 6, 2008 as a promotional single. It was initially released alongside "Bodysnatchers" in the United Kingdom. The music video for "House of Cards", directed by James Frost, was produced using lidar technology and released in June 2008.

Writing 
The Radiohead singer, Thom Yorke, first performed "House of Cards" in an acoustic rendition at the 2005 Trade Justice rally in London. According to the bassist, Colin Greenwood, an early version had a bass riff in the style of R.E.M. Yorke and the drummer, Philip Selway, reworked the song with the rhythm on the final version.

Music video
The music video, directed by James Frost, was produced in a minimal set in Florida. It features rendered images of Yorke's face as well as those of several other people, interspersed with images of suburban landscapes and people attending a party. In lieu of traditional cameras, the video was made with lidar technology, which detects the proximity of objects from the sensor.

The lidar gives the video a grainy, grid-like appearance. The filmmakers passed sheets of acrylic glass and mirrors through the lasers to create scenes in which the image appears distorted, partially disappears, or disintegrate as if being carried by wind. The data used to make the video was released as open source under the Creative Commons Attribution-Noncommercial-Share Alike 3.0 license and is available at Google Code as both CSV raw data and Processing code.

Release
At the 51st Annual Grammy Awards, "House of Cards" was nominated for the Grammy Awards for Best Rock Performance by a Duo or Group with Vocal, Best Rock Song and Best Music Video. A performance of "House of Cards" was included on the 2008 live video In Rainbows – From the Basement.

Personnel
Adapted from the In Rainbows liner notes.

Radiohead
 Colin Greenwood
 Jonny Greenwood
 Ed O'Brien
 Philip Selway
 Thom Yorke

Production
 Nigel Godrich – production, mixing, engineering
 Richard Woodcraft – engineering
 Hugo Nicolson – engineering
 Dan Grech-Marguerat – engineering
 Graeme Stewart – preproduction
 Bob Ludwig – mastering

Artwork
 Stanley Donwood
 Dr Tchock

Charts

Release history

References

External links
 

Radiohead songs
Rock ballads
2008 singles
Experimental rock songs
XL Recordings singles
Song recordings produced by Nigel Godrich
Songs written by Thom Yorke
Songs written by Colin Greenwood
Songs written by Jonny Greenwood
Songs written by Philip Selway
Songs written by Ed O'Brien
2007 songs